The men's 100 metre butterfly competition at the 1997 Pan Pacific Swimming Championships took place on August 12 at the NISHI Civic Pool.  The last champion was Scott Miller of Australia.

This race consisted of two lengths of the pool, all in butterfly.

Records
Prior to this competition, the existing world and Pan Pacific records were as follows:

Results
All times are in minutes and seconds.

Heats
The first round was held on August 12.

B Final
The B final was held on August 12.

A Final
The A final was held on August 12.

References

1997 Pan Pacific Swimming Championships